Cercemaggiore is a comune (municipality) in the Province of Campobasso in the Italian region Molise, located about  southeast of Campobasso.

Cercemaggiore borders the following municipalities: Castelpagano, Cercepiccola, Gildone, Jelsi, Mirabello Sannitico, Morcone, Riccia, Santa Croce del Sannio, Sepino.

References

External links
 Official website

Cities and towns in Molise